Feyzianeh-e Sofla (also Romanized as Feyzīāneh-e Soflá; also known as Feyzīāneh-e Pā’īn, Fezāneh Pā’īn, Fezāneh-ye Pā’īn, and Fezyāneh-ye Soflá) is a village in Hendudur Rural District, Sarband District, Shazand County, Markazi Province, Iran. At the 2006 census, its population was 254, in 60 families.

References 

Populated places in Shazand County